Gavet may refer to:
Gavet de la Conca, a village in the province of Lleida and autonomous community of Catalonia, Spain
James Gavet (b. 1989), New Zealand rugby league footballer
Livet-et-Gavet, a commune in the Isère department in south-eastern France